The 1957–58 Scottish Division One was won by Heart of Midlothian, who scored a record number of goals in a single season and became the only club to have a goal difference exceeding 100. East Fife and Queen's Park finished 17th and 18th respectively and were relegated to the 1958–59 Scottish Division Two.

League table

Results

References

Scottish Football Archive

1957–58 Scottish Football League
Scottish Division One seasons
Scot